Hyperochtha acanthovalva is a moth in the family Lecithoceridae. It was described by Kyu-Tek Park in 2001. It is found in Sri Lanka.

The wingspan is 9.5–10 mm. The forewings are brown, with the median fascia dark brown, subquadrate and broadly developed near the basal one-third. There is a dark brown spot at the end of the cell and the postmedian line is weak and slightly serrate. The hindwings are pale grey.

Etymology
The species name refers to the spines in the valve of the male genitalia and is derived from acanth (meaning spine).

References

Moths described in 2001
Hyperochtha